Mario Maurano (6 August 1905 - 27 December 1974) was an Argentine film score composer and pianist, best remembered for his tangos. He was especially known for his orchestral work supporting starlet Libertad Lamarque, with songs including Te quiero (1946) and many more. He was a frequent collaborator with director Luis Moglia Barth in the Golden Age of Argentine cinema, and was particularly prolific in the late 1930s and 1940s, composing for films such as Twelve Women (1939), Confesión (1940), Con el dedo en el gatillo (1940), Huella (1940), and Boína blanca (1941). He also worked on films such as Caminito de Gloria (1939) with Luis César Amadori, and  La Verdadera victoria (1944) with Carlos F. Borcosque.

Selected filmography
 Paths of Faith (1938)
 The Life of Carlos Gardel (1939)
Educating Niní (1940)
 Girls Orchestra (1941)
 Saint Candida (1945)

References

External links

Mario Maurano at Cinenacional.com

1905 births
1974 deaths
Argentine film score composers
Male film score composers
Argentine pianists
20th-century pianists
20th-century composers
Male pianists
20th-century male musicians